KBBQ-FM (102.7 MHz "102.7 The Vibe") is a commercial Top 40 radio station located in Van Buren, Arkansas, broadcasting to the Fort Smith, Arkansas, area.

External links
Station Website

BBQ
Contemporary hit radio stations in the United States
Radio stations established in 1982
Cumulus Media radio stations
1982 establishments in Arkansas
Van Buren, Arkansas